Lieutenant-Colonel William Anstruther-Gray, FSA, JP, DL (6 September 1859 – 17 April 1938) was a Scottish soldier and politician.

Biography
The son of Colonel John Anstruther-Thomson of Charleton, Colinsburgh, Fife, and Maria Hamilton Gray of Carntyne, Glasgow, he was educated at Eton.

He adopted name of Gray on succeeding to the Carntyne estate in 1904.

He joined the Militia's Fife Artillery as a Sub-Lieutenant (Supernumerary) on 16 December 1876. He served for four years until he joined the 13th Hussars as a second lieutenant in 1880, served in India and Afghanistan in 1880-1881 and was promoted to lieutenant on 1 July 1881, before transferring to the Royal Horse Guards in 1885. He was Aide-de-Camp to the Earl of Kintore, Governor of South Australia, from 1889 to 1891, was promoted to captain on 30 December 1893, and to major on 1 May 1897. He served in South Africa from 1901 to 1902 where he was commandant of the district of Knysna in 1901, and Inspector of Concentration Camps in Transvaal in 1902. Following the end of the war in June 1902, he returned to the United Kingdom in the SS Dunottar Castle, which arrived at Southampton in July 1902. He later commanded 3rd Line Group, Scottish Horse during World War I.

He was unsuccessful candidate for St Andrews Burghs in 1903, and represented that constituency as a Liberal Unionist (beginning in 1912 Unionist) from 1906-January 1910 and from December 1910–1918.

Family
He married Clayre Tennant CBE JP, daughter of Andrew Tennant of Essenside on 26 January 1891 at St. Peter's Church, Glenelg, South Australia. They had one son, William John St Clair Anstruther-Gray, and one daughter Jean Helen St. Clair Campbell.

References

External links 
 

1859 births
1938 deaths
People educated at Eton College
Members of the Parliament of the United Kingdom for Fife constituencies
Liberal Unionist Party MPs for Scottish constituencies
Unionist Party (Scotland) MPs
UK MPs 1906–1910
UK MPs 1910–1918
13th Hussars officers
Royal Horse Guards officers
British Army personnel of the Second Boer War
British Army personnel of World War I
British Militia officers
Scottish Horse officers
Deputy Lieutenants of Fife
20th-century Scottish politicians
William